Lemyra phasma is a moth of the family Erebidae. It was described by John Henry Leech in 1899. It is found in China (Sichuan, Yunnan, Hunan, Hubei, Guizhou, Tibet) and possibly northern Vietnam.

References

 

phasma
Moths described in 1899